Edward Richard George Steere (10 July 1908 – 1 June 1967) was a New Zealand rugby union player. A lock, Steere represented  at a provincial level, and was a member of the New Zealand national side, the All Blacks, between 1928 and 1932. He played 21 matches for the All Blacks including six internationals, and captained the team in two matches on their 1932 tour of Australia. He scored one try for New Zealand, against Newcastle at Newcastle on the 1932 tour.

Steere was also known as a sprinter and shot putter, and finished second in the shot put at the 1934 New Zealand athletics championships. He married Bessie Owen on 17 August 1936, at St John's Church, Napier.

References

1908 births
1967 deaths
People from Raetihi
People educated at Napier Boys' High School
New Zealand rugby union players
New Zealand international rugby union players
Hawke's Bay rugby union players
Rugby union locks
New Zealand male shot putters
Rugby union players from Manawatū-Whanganui